The Nangarhar Provincial Museum is a museum located in Hadda, Afghanistan.

References

See also 
 List of museums in Afghanistan

Museums in Afghanistan